Rokometni klub Trimo Trebnje, commonly referred to as Trimo Trebnje, is a Slovenian handball club from Trebnje which competes in the Slovenian First League of Handball.

External links
Official website 

Handball clubs established in 1983
1983 establishments in Slovenia
Slovenian handball clubs
Municipality of Trebnje